Deh Now-ye Moqaddasi (also Romanized as Dehnow-ye Moqaddasī, Deh Now-e Maqaddas, and Deh Now-ye Moqaddas; also known as Deh Now, Deh Nau, and Deh-ī-Nau) is a village in Valanjerd Rural District, in the Central District of Borujerd County, Lorestan Province, Iran. At the 2006 census, its population was 956, in 231 families.

References 

Towns and villages in Borujerd County